Vicente Alves de Oliveira Júnior (born 11 April 1985) better known as Vicentinho Júnior is a Brazilian politician. Although born in Goiás, he has spent his political career representing Tocantins, having served as federal deputy representative since 2015.

Personal life
Vicentinho Júnior was born to Vicente Alves de Oliveira e Adailde Alves de Oliveira. In addition to being a politician, Vicentinho Júnior previously was a businessman.

Political career
Initially affiliated with the Brazilian Socialist Party, Vicentinho Júnior was elected to the chamber of deputies under the party's banner in the 2014 Brazilian general election. In 2015 he joined the Party of the Republic. In November 2018 Vicentinho Júnior became the leader of the Party of the Republic for the state of Tocantins.

Vicentinho Júnior voted against the impeachment of then-president Dilma Rousseff. He voted in favor of the 2017 Brazilian labor reform, and would vote in favor of opening of a corruption investigation into Rousseff's successor Michel Temer.

References 

1985 births
Living people
People from Goiânia
Brazilian businesspeople
Brazilian Socialist Party politicians
Liberal Party (Brazil, 2006) politicians
Members of the Chamber of Deputies (Brazil) from Tocantins